Prawn Nebula, also known  as IC 4628, is an emission nebula located in the Sagittarius Arm of the Milky Way, around 6,000 light-years from Earth in the constellation Scorpius.  It forms part of the tail of the "False Comet" anchored by the bright open cluster NGC 6231.

Gallery

References

External links
 

H II regions
IC objects
Scorpius (constellation)